Mount Kailash  (also Kailasa; Kangrinboqê or Gang Rinpoche; Tibetan: གངས་རིན་པོ་ཆེ; ;), is a mountain in the Ngari Prefecture, Tibet Autonomous Region of China. It lies in the Kailash Range (Gangdisê Mountains) of the Transhimalaya, in the western part of the Tibetan Plateau. Mount Kailash is less than 100 km towards the north from the western trijunction of the borders of China, India, and Nepal.

Mount Kailash is located close to Lake Manasarovar and Lake Rakshastal. The sources of four major Asian rivers lie close to this mountain and the two lakes. These rivers are the Indus, the Sutlej, the Brahmaputra, and the Karnali (a tributary of the Ganges, fed by Mabja Zangbo). Mount Kailash is considered sacred in four religions: Hinduism, Buddhism, Jainism and Bon.

Etymology
The mountain is known as “” (var.  ) in Sanskrit. The name also could have been derived from the word “”, which means "crystal".

In his Tibetan-English dictionary, Chandra (1902: p. 32) identifies the entry for 'kai la sha' which is a loan word from Sanskrit.

The Tibetan name for the mountain is Gang Rinpoche (Tibetan: གངས་རིན་པོ་ཆེ་). Gang or Kang is the Tibetan word for snow peak analogous to alp or hima; rinpoche is an honorific meaning "precious one" so the combined term can be translated "precious jewel of snows". Alice Albinia lists some of the names for the mountain, and its religious significance to various faiths:

Another local name for the mountain is Tisé mountain, which derives from ti tse in the Zhang-Zhung language, meaning "water peak" or "river peak", connoting the mountain's status as the source of the mythical Lion, Horse, Peacock and Elephant Rivers, and in fact the Indus, Yarlung Tsangpo/Dihang/Brahmaputra, Karnali and Sutlej all begin in the Kailash-Lake Manasarovara region.

Geology 

The region around Mount Kailash and the Indus headwaters area is typified by wide-scale faulting of metamorphosed late Cretaceous to mid Cenozoic sedimentary rocks which have been intruded by igneous Cenozoic granitic rocks. Mount Kailash appears to be a metasedimentary roof pendant supported by a massive granite base. The Cenozoic rocks represent offshore marine limestones deposited before subduction of the Tethys oceanic crust. These sediments were deposited on the southern margin of the Asia block during subduction of the Tethys oceanic crust before the collision between the Indian and Asian continents.

Religious significance

In Hinduism
In Hinduism, it is traditionally recognized as the abode of Shiva, who resided there along with his consort goddess Parvati and their children, Ganesha and Kartikeya.

In the Uttara Kanda section of the epic Ramayana, it is said that Ravana attempted to uproot the Mount Kailash as retaliation to lord Shiva, who in turn, pressed his right big toe upon the mountain, trapping Ravana in between. This version of lord Shiva is also referred to as Ravananugraha, or favour form to Ravana while seated in mount Kailash.

According to the epic Mahabharata, it is said that the Pandava brothers, along with their wife Draupadi, trekked to the summit of mount Kailash on their path to liberation, as it is considered to be a gateway to Heaven, also known as Swarga Loka.

According to Charles Allen, one description in the Vishnu Purana of the mountain states that its four faces are made of crystal, ruby, gold, and lapis lazuli. It is a pillar of the world and is located at the heart of six mountain ranges symbolizing a lotus.

In Jainism

According to Jain scriptures, Ashtapada is the site where the first Jain Tirthankara, Rishabhadeva attained moksha (liberation). In Jain tradition, it is believed that after Rishabhdeva attained nirvana, his son emperor Bharata Chakravartin had constructed three stupas and twenty four shrines of the 24 tirthankaras over there with their idols studded with precious stones and named it Sinhnishdha.

Nirvan Kand Bhasha also mentions of Ashtapada.(दोहा)

वीतराग वन्दौं सदा, भाव सहित सिर नाय |

कहूं काण्ड निर्वाण की, भाषा सुगम बनाये ||

(चौपाई)

अष्टापद आदीश्वर स्वामि, वासुपूज्य चम्पापुरि नामि |

नेमिनाथ स्वामी गिरनार, वन्दौं भाव भगति उर धार ||1||

चरम तीर्थकर चरम शरीर, पावापुरि स्वामि महावीर |

शिखर समेद जिनेसुर बीस, भावसहित वन्दौं निश दीस ||2||In Jain tradition, the 24th and last Tirthankara, Vardhamana Mahavira, was taken to the summit of Meru by Indra shortly after his birth, after putting his mother Queen Trishala into deep slumber. There he was bathed and anointed with precious unctions.

In Buddhism
Mount Kailash (Kailasa) is known as Mount Meru in Buddhist texts. It is central to its cosmology, and a major pilgrimage site for some Buddhist traditions.

Vajrayana Buddhists believe that Mount Kailash is the home of the buddha Cakrasaṃvara (also known as Demchok), who represents supreme bliss.

Numerous sites in the region are associated with Padmasambhava, whose tantric practices in holy sites around Tibet are credited with finally establishing Buddhism as the main religion of the country in the 7th–8th century CE.

It is said that Milarepa (c. 1052 – c. 1135), champion of Vajrayana, arrived in Tibet to challenge Naro Bönchung, champion of the Bön religion of Tibet. The two magicians engaged in a terrifying sorcerers' battle, but neither was able to gain a decisive advantage. Finally, it was agreed that whoever could reach the summit of Kailash most rapidly would be the victor. While Naro Bönchung sat on magic drum and soared up the slope, Milarepa's followers were dumbfounded to see him sitting still and meditating. Yet when Naro Bönchung was nearly at the top, Milarepa suddenly moved into action and overtook him by riding on sunlight, thus winning the contest. He did, however, fling a handful of snow on to the top of a nearby mountain, since known as Bönri, bequeathing it to the Bönpo and thereby ensuring continued Bönpo connections with the region.

In Bön 
Bön, a religion native to Tibet, maintains that the entire mystical region and Kailash, which adherents call the "nine-story Swastika Mountain", is the axis mundi, Tagzig Olmo Lung Ring.

Pilgrimage

The history of the Kailash-Manasarovar pilgrimage 
The history of the Mt Kailash pilgrimage is closely tied with the history of the pilgrimage to Lake Manasarovar. For this history, see the section 'History and texts' on the Lake Manasarovar page.

The Kailash parikrama, or kora 
The Sanskrit word for circumambulation of a holy site is 'Parikrama', and the Tibetan word for the same act is 'kora'. Both words are widely used to describe the act of circumambulating Mt Kailash. Pilgrims of several religions believe that doing the parikrama/kora of Mount Kailash on foot is a spiritually beneficial practice that can bring various positive effects, such as the collection of meritorious karma, the cleansing of sins from one's consciousness, and good fortune. The circumambulation is made in a clockwise direction by Hindus, Buddhists, and Jains, while Bönpos circumambulate the mountain in a counterclockwise direction. 

Walking around the mountain has to be done on foot, pony or domestic yak, and takes some three days of trekking. The highest point on the pilgrimage is the Drölma pass at 5,650m (18,540 feet). One camps on two nights en route: firstlly, near the meadow of Dirapuk gompa, some  before the pass, and secondly, after crossing the pass and going as far downhill as possible (while passing by Gauri Kund lake less than a hundred meters below the Drolma La pass). The second night halt is often at Zutulphuk.  

Most pilgrims take three days to complete the pilgrimage. Some pilgrims, usually Tibetans or Nepali people from high altitude regions, do it in a single day. Some other pilgrims venture a very demanding regimen, performing body-length prostrations over the entire length of the circumambulation. The pilgrim bends down, kneels, prostrates full-length, makes a mark with her fingers, rises to her knees, prays, and then crawls forward on hands and knees to the mark made by her fingers before repeating the process. With this method, the pilgrimage takes at least three weeks to complete.  

The mountain is located in a particularly remote and inhospitable area of the Tibetan Himalayas. A few modern amenities, such as benches, resting places, and refreshment kiosks, exist to aid the pilgrims in their devotion. For varied reasons for the different faiths that revere the mountain, setting foot on Mt Kailash's slopes and attempting to climb it is forbidden.

Mountaineering 

In 1926, Hugh Ruttledge studied the north face, which he estimated was 6,000 feet (1,800 m) high and "utterly unclimbable" and thought about an ascent of the northeast ridge, but he ran out of time. Ruttledge had been exploring the area with Colonel R. C. Wilson, who was on the other side of the mountain with his Sherpa named Tseten. Wilson said that Tseten told him: "'Sahib, we can climb that!' ... as he too saw that this [the SE ridge] represented a feasible route to the summit." Wilson went on to explain that although he was serious about climbing Kailash, he ran into unexpected difficulties: "Just when I discovered an easy walk to the summit of the mountain, heavy snow began to fall, making the ascent impossible."

Herbert Tichy was in the area in 1936, attempting to climb Gurla Mandhata. When he asked one of the Garpons of Ngari whether Kailash was climbable, the Garpon replied: "Only a man entirely free of sin could climb Kailash. And he wouldn't have to actually scale the sheer walls of ice to do it – he'd just turn himself into a bird and fly to the summit."

Reinhold Messner was given the opportunity by the Chinese government to climb in the mid-1980s. But he declined, saying “If we conquer this mountain, then we conquer something in people's souls.” 

In 2001, reports emerged that the Chinese government had given permission for a Spanish team to climb the peak, which caused an international backlash. Chinese authorities disputed the reports, and stated that any climbing activities on Mt Kailash were strictly prohibited.

Access

Since the 1980s, the numbers of pilgrims going on a Kailash pilgrimage annually has grown considerably. In 2007, over 70,000 people visited the area around Mount Kailash and the two holy lakes nearby. Most of them were pilgrims, and these included about 18,000 foreign visitors (foreign here implying non-Tibetan/non-Chinese). In the years just before the COVID-19 pandemic, several thousand pilgrims from India were going to this pilgrimage every year, mostly through Nepal. While many more aspire to undertake this pilgrimage, it remains out of reach for most due to high expenses; the risks and difficulties posed by the remoteness of Mt Kailash and the high-altitude of the pilgrimage route, and the unpredictable closures of this pilgrimage due to adverse developments in the regional geopolitics.

Every year, Kailash pilgrimage is possible only between April and mid-October. April-June and September-October are recommended periods for the pilgrimage; in July and August, monsoonal rains can make the circumambulation somewhat challenging. Between late October and early April, the winter conditions can be extremely severe in this high, windswept corner of Tibet, and generally make the pilgrimage impossible. 

For all foreigners, including pilgrims from India and Nepal, passports and specific Chinese visas valid for the Kailash pilgrimage are necessary.

Routes through India 
Indian pilgrims have the option of going either through the annual Kailash pilgrimages organised by the Government of India's Ministry of External Affairs (MEA), or through private groups organised by various travel companies. For the pilgrimages organised by the Government of India, a person has to be an Indian citizen with a passport valid for at least six months as on September 1 of the current year, besides certain other conditions. The selection of candidates by the government is done through a "fair computer-generated, random, gender-balanced selection process", through which the selected candidates are also assigned either of the two routes to Kailash currently open through India: the Lipu Lekh pass in Uttarakhand and  the Nathu La pass in Sikkim. No private travel companies are allowed to conduct the Kailash-Manasarovar pilgrimage via these two routes. In each batch of Kailash Manasarovar Yatra organised by the Government of India, an Indian government official accompanies the group as a Liaison Officer. 

 The Lipu Lekh route involves briefing and medical checks in Delhi, from there travel to the Lipu Lekh pass, and beyond that travel in Tibet for the Kailash-Manasarovar pilgrimage. Till recently, the Lipu Lekh route required 5-7 days of trekking along the Indian side of the Mahakali valley, from Narayan Ashram till the Lipu Lekh pass. Thereon, the travel to Taklakot and Darchen in Tibet would happen by bus or other vehicles. In 2020, a new motorable road was inaugurated to the Lipu Lekh pass through the Indian side of the Mahakali valley, removing the need to walk the Indian part of the Lipu Lekh route to Mt Kailash. 
 The Nathu La route involves briefing and medical checks in Delhi; then a flight from Delhi to Bagdogra; Bagdogra to Nathu La pass via Gangtok, and three days of road journeys in Tibet till arrival in Darchen on the third day.

Routes through Nepal 
The groups organised by travel companies usually go through Nepal. People from all nationalities can go in these groups. Anyone who has the valid documents and can pay, can go with such groups. Generally, there are fewer medical requirements involved in going to Kailash-Manasarovar with private travel companies. 

 In the recent years, the general route via Nepal has been the route through the Humla district in northwestern Nepal. This route involves three flights ahead of Kathmandu: Kathmandu-Nepalgunj, Nepalgunj-Simikot, and Simikot-Hilsa (Simikot-Hilsa by helicopter). From Hilsa, the group crosses into Tibet (China). Hilsa to Darchen can be done within a single day. But generally, groups acclimatize at Taklakot for a night, and also tend to stay at Chiu Gumba by the shores of Lake Manasarovar for a night, before arriving at Darchen. 
 There is also a possibility of viewing Mt Kailash from within Nepal. This is possible from the Lapcha La pass above the Limi valley, in district Humla. This route involves trekking from Simikot to Lapcha La, a journey that usually takes 4-5 days. This option has been becoming known as a means to get the 'darshan' of Kailash especially in times when entry into Tibet has become forbidden for any reason. 
 A second major route through Nepal, which actually used to be the main route to Kailash through Nepal till the April 2015 Nepal Earthquake, is the Tatopani-Zangmu route. It was closed for four years following extensive damage due to the 7.8 Richter-scale-intensity earthquake, till 2019. Zangmu to Darchen is a 3-4 day drive.
 A third major route through Nepal is the Rasuwa-Gyirong route. Gyirong to Darchen is a three-day drive. This route is close to the Tatopani-Zangmu route, and became important especially in the period when the Tatopani-Zangmu route was closed for four years.

Routes through Tibet 
For private travel companies, both in Nepal and in Tibet (China), another important route to Kailash is the one via Lhasa. In this one, pilgrims first arrive at Lhasa by road, flight or other means, and from there they make a four-day road journey to Lake Manasarovar or Darchen. Other than the Lipu Lekh route through India and the Humla route through Nepal, all the major routes to Kailash through Tibet - from Lhasa, Zangmu, Gyirong, and Nathu La - involve 3-4 days of long drives through the high-altitude Tibetan plateau and some mountain ranges on it, to reach to Darchen.

Climate change 
Climate change due to global warming is happening three times faster on the Tibetan Plateau than anywhere else in the world. Mount Kailash is located in a mountain range upon the Tibetan Plateau, near the plateau's western edges. According to local observers, the land around Mount Kailash has been growing warmer in recent years; the pilgrimage season isn't as cold as it used to be. According to available data from the region, glaciers are retreating, lakes are shrinking, the amount of barren land is increasing, and the eventual thawing of the permafrost in this region may lead to uncertain effects on water resources and carbon cycles. The intergovernmental organisation ICIMOD is involved in ongoing efforts to generate knowledge on the ecological, social, and economic effects of climate change, and sustainable ways to cope with them, in the Chinese region around Mt Kailash and the bordering areas of Uttarakhand (India) and western Nepal, in a transboundary project called the Kailash Sacred Landscape Conservation and Development Initiative.

See also 
 Gurla Mandhata
 Kawagarbo
 Om Parvat
 Adi Kailash
 Kinnaur Kailash
 Mani Mahesh Kailash
 Shrikhand Kailash
 Sacred mountains
 Kailash: A Journal of Himalayan Studies

References

Bibliography
 
Albinia, Alice. (2008) Empires of the Indus: The Story of a River. First American Edition (2010) W. W. Norton & Company, New York. 
Bubriski, Kevin and Abhimanyu Pandey. Kailash Yatra: a Long Walk to Mt Kailash through Humla. New Delhi: Penguin Random House, 2018
 Nomachi, Kazuyoshi. Tibet. Boston: Shambhala, 1997.
 Thurman, Robert and Tad Wise, Circling the Sacred Mountain: A Spiritual Adventure Through the Himalayas. New York: Bantam, 1999.  — Tells the story of a Western Buddhist making the trek around Mount Kailash.
 Snelling, John. (1990). The Sacred Mountain: The Complete Guide to Tibet's Mount Kailas. 1st edition 1983. Revised and enlarged edition, including: Kailas-Manasarovar Travellers' Guide. Forwards by H.H. the Dalai Lama of Tibet and Christmas Humphreys. East-West Publications, London and The Hague. .
 (Elevation) Chinese Snow Map "Kangrinboqe", published by the Lanzhou Institute of Glaciology, Chinese Academy of Sciences.
 Allen, Charles (1982) A Mountain in Tibet: The Search for Mount Kailas and the Sources of the Great Rivers of Asia. (London, André Deutsch).
 Allen, Charles. (1999). The Search for Shangri-La: A Journey into Tibetan History. Little, Brown and Company. Reprint: Abacus, London. 2000. .
 "A Tibetan Guide for Pilgrimage to Ti-se (Mount Kailas) and mTsho Ma-pham (Lake Manasarovar)." Toni Huber and Tsepak Rigzin. In: Sacred Spaces and Powerful Places in Tibetan Culture: A Collection of Essays. (1999) Edited by Toni Huber, pp. 125–153. The Library of Tibetan Works and Archives, Dharamsala, H.P., India. .
 Stein, R. A. (1961). Les tribus anciennes des marches Sino-Tibétaines: légendes, classifications et histoire. Presses Universitaires de France, Paris. (In French)
 Johnson, Russell, and Moran, Kerry. (1989).  The Sacred Mountain of Tibet: On Pilgrimage to Kailas.  Park Street Press, Rochester, Vermont. .
 Govinda, Lama Anagarika. (1966). The Way of the White Clouds: A Buddhist Pilgrim in Tibet. Shambhala Publications, Inc. Boulder, Colorado. Reprint with foreword by Peter Matthiessen: Shambhala Publications, Inc. Boston, Massachusetts. 1988. 
 Thubron, Colin. (2011). "To a Mountain in Tibet." Chatto & Windus, London.

External links

Kailash
Hindu pilgrimage sites in China
Kailash
Buddhist pilgrimage sites in China
Hindu tantra
Tibetan Buddhist places
Padal Petra Stalam
Six-thousanders of the Transhimalayas
Mountains in Buddhism